Sir John Francis Whitaker Maitland (24 March 1903 – 17 November 1977) was a Conservative Party politician in the United Kingdom.

In the 1945 general election, he was elected as Member of Parliament for the safe Conservative seat of Horncastle in Lincolnshire.  He held the seat until he retired from the House of Commons at the 1966 general election.

His daughter, Sally Louisa Mary Maitland, married the Conservative Member of Parliament Jock Bruce-Gardyne.

References

1903 births
1977 deaths
Members of the Parliament of the United Kingdom for English constituencies
UK MPs 1945–1950
UK MPs 1950–1951
UK MPs 1951–1955
UK MPs 1955–1959
UK MPs 1959–1964
UK MPs 1964–1966